This list consists of notable dishes and foods in which onion is used as a primary ingredient. Onions are widely used in cooking. They are very versatile and can be baked, boiled, braised, grilled, fried, roasted, sautéed or eaten raw.

Onion dishes

 
  – consists of one large onion which is cut to resemble a flower, which is then battered and deep-fried
 
 
  
 Creamed onion

See also

 List of foods
 List of garlic dishes
 List of mushroom dishes
 List of vegetable dishes

References

 
Onion